Dr. M.V. Vasu popularly known as Vasu Malali was a Kannada author, historian, columnist and film director. She was born on 7 February 1967. She was the eldest daughter of well known Kannada writer Dr. Malali Vasanth Kumar and Smt. Shantha Vasanth Kumar

Achievement 
She was a very good Academician and a Progressive Thinker.  She worked on Oral History. She thought that Oral History which passes from mouth to mouth in generations gives the actual picture of the past. That is the good record of real History.
She had concern towards upliftment of downtrodden. 
She was a Good Orator. She had given a good number of invited lectures in various organizations and Universities.
She had completed her film direction course in Hollywood. 
She had directed a good number of documentaries.
She had directed Short films.
She had directed a Kannada film 'Shastra' starred by actor Kishore and Yajna Shetty in lead roles.

Publications 
She was writing a column  "Kallu Balli" in Prajawani, a well known Kannada daily of Karnataka, India. The articles in this column had given a new insight to the various social, cultural and economic problems of the country.  They were not confined to local problems but applies to global scenario.
She had published several books in Kannada including "Moukhika Ithihasa" which discusses about the Oral History and its tradition.

Filmography 
Shastra (Kannada)

Death 
Vasu Malali died on 3 February 2015.

References

External links 
Article on Vasu Malali by Dr. Nataraj Huliyar
Article on Vasu Malali by K Neela
Article on  Vasu Malali by Belur Raghunandan

1967 births
2015 deaths
Indian women film directors
Kannada film directors